The Council House is a municipal building in North Street, Chichester, West Sussex, England. It is a Grade II* listed building.

History
The building was commissioned as successor to the Chichester Guildhall where meetings of Chichester City Council had been held since the mid 16th century. The new building, which was designed by Roger Morris in the Palladian style, was completed in 1731. It was funded by public subscription and a significant donor was Charles Lennox, 2nd Duke of Richmond. The building was extended at the rear, by local builder Thomas Andrews, to create the assembly rooms which were designed as a double cube with an apse at the east end by James Wyatt and completed in October 1783.

A large Purbeck Marble stone, sometimes known as "the Purbeck Stone", which had been unearthed during the construction of the building and which is thought to have formed part of a Roman temple, was subsequently embedded into the west wall of the complex. It bears an inscription which suggests that the temple was dedicated to the gods Neptune and Minerva on the orders of Tiberius Claudius Cogidubnus, a 1st-century king of the Regni or Regnenses tribe.

In 1789, William Pitt, the then Prime Minister, held a meeting with Charles Lennox, 3rd Duke of Richmond in the assembly rooms and, in 1805, a function was held there to celebrate the Battle of Trafalgar. In 1810, the quaker, Joseph Lancaster gave a lecture there which inspired the foundation of the Lancastrian School in Chichester. Functions were also held in the assembly rooms to celebrate the Coronation of William IV and Adelaide in September 1831 and the enactment of the Reform Bill in June 1832. The Italian violinist, Niccolò Paganini, performed in the assembly rooms during his tour of Britain in 1832 and the virtuoso pianist, Franz Liszt, gave two concerts there in 1840. The complex was extended to the south in 1880.

The ante room to the assembly rooms contains a replica of the bust of Charles I by Hubert Le Sueur, the original of which is in the Pallant House Gallery, as well a cabinet containing a collection of the belongings of Vice-Admiral Sir George Murray, who served with Vice-Admiral Lord Nelson at the Battle of Copenhagen in April 1801 and went on to be Mayor of Chichester in 1815. There is also a list of people who have received the freedom of the City of Chichester who include the Duke of Richmond and Gordon in 2008, The Very Reverend Nicholas Frayling, Dean of Chichester in 2013 and the astronaut, Tim Peake in 2018.

Meetings of Chichester City Council continue to be held in the Council House. Meanwhile the assembly rooms, which can accommodate 180 people seated, continue to be used for wedding receptions and similar functions.

References

Further reading

City and town halls in West Sussex
Buildings and structures in Chichester
Grade II* listed buildings in West Sussex
Government buildings completed in 1731